The Miss Earth México 2010, the ninth edition of the pageant, was held at the Yucatán Siglo XXI Convention Centre in Mérida, Yucatán, México on September 17, 2010. Thirty-two delegates competed for the national title, which was won by Claudia Mollinedo from Tabasco. López was crowned by Miss Earth México 2009, Natalia Quiñones from Jalisco.

Miss Earth México 2010 represented the country in the international Miss Earth 2010 pageant which was held in Vinpearl Land, Nha Trang, Vietnam on November 28, 2010.

Results

Special awards

Delegates

See also
Miss Earth Mexico

References

External links
Official Website

2010
2010 in Mexico
2010 beauty pageants